Go to Blazes is a 1962 British comedy film directed by Michael Truman and starring Dave King, Robert Morley, Norman Rossington, Daniel Massey, Dennis Price, Maggie Smith, and David Lodge. It also featured Arthur Lowe and John Le Mesurier, later to feature prominently in Dad's Army.

Plot
Somewhere in London a refined gent in a bowler hat walks along the road with flowers and chocolates, seemingly on his way to a date. He stops at a jeweller's window and looks at the rings. Suddenly he throws the box (containing a brick) through the window, and grabs the jewels. A Citroen DS rushes up and he gets inside to join his two friends. The police give chase and they are doing well until stopped at a junction for a fire engine to pass. They are caught and sent to Wormwood Scrubs.

The trio decide that a fire engine is the least likely form of transport to be delayed by traffic. Following release, the incompetent criminals go to a fire engine salesroom (if such a thing exists) where the salesman (Miles Malleson) extols the virtues of the various machines. However, they cannot afford £5000 for a new engine and go to a scrap yard to buy an old one.

They then steal a well-maintained 1930s fire engine, stored in a remote fire station, and swap it for their scrap engine of the same type, burning down the fire station to hide the theft, leaving the burnt out scrapper in the debris. Having parked their engine in a big shed in Smithfield, they identify a jeweller to rob on a corner near Berkeley Square, and get firemen's uniforms in a costume shop.

Testing their theory, their first attempt to rob the jeweller's shop ends in disaster. While Harry is dodging the police, he escapes into a show of wedding dresses, where he meets the French owner Chantal (Maggie Smith), and pretends he is the son of Lady Hamilton, one of her rich clients. He arranges a dinner date with her. Meanwhile, Bernard and Alfie in the fire engine are flagged down by a desperate home-owner (Derek Nimmo), whose basement flat is flooding and has mistaken them for the real fire brigade. Their attempts to pump out the flat make matters worse, because they only add water, and they flee the scene with hoses trailing behind them when the real fire engine arrives.

Failure only makes them more determined, and they decide they need to be more professional so they can pass as trained firemen, their obvious incompetence at the flooded flat having ruined their plans.  An acquaintance, (mad professor) "Arson Eddie" (Robert Morley), is unwilling to help them because he is devoted to arson - the creation of the "sacred flame". He knows all there is to know about starting fires, but next to nothing about putting them out.

A chance conversation heard outside a fire station puts them onto Withers (Dennis Price), a fire chief dismissed from the service for arson, theft and conduct unbecoming. He is persuaded to train them in exchange for a share in the proceeds of a bank job.

Chantal's salon is next to a bank and they decide a fire in her basement would be a suitable ruse to put them conveniently close to the bank. They return to Arson Eddie for a fire-raising scheme. Chantal has a meeting with her boss, Madame Colette, who reveals the business is in financial difficulty but the dress collection is insured for £20,000. "Blimey" she says, revealing her true cockney accent, before reverting to her faux French. Arson Eddie visits the dress shop, claiming to be a potential client, "Mr Mountbatten". He is enchanted by the women and is continually thwarted in his attempts to start a fire. However, Madame Colette sets fire to the curtains as part of her own plan.

The bank robbery takes place from the basement but the fire above is very real and the real fire brigade arrives. The thieves escape with a fire hose stuffed with banknotes. Colette and Chantal are surprised when they spot Harry and "Mr Mountbatten" on the fire engine in their firemen's uniforms. A policeman (David Lodge) overhears and gives chase.

As the robbers make their getaway, they are flagged down by two young girls whose treehouse is on fire, and once more they are required to join in the fighting of a real fire. Undeterred, well equipped and, above all, well trained, they join in.

Unfortunately for them, Alfie attaches the wrong hose to the pump and covers the scene of the fire with the stolen money instead of water.

The film ends with the crooks sitting in the "Black Maria" on their way to their next stint in prison. In the window behind the van, the Queen, in a royal limousine, can be seen. Bernard remarks that he has just had another idea for the perfect getaway vehicle.

Cast
Dave King as Bernard
Robert Morley as Arson Eddie
Daniel Massey as Harry
Dennis Price as Withers
Coral Browne as Colette
Norman Rossington as Alfie
Maggie Smith as Chantal
Miles Malleson as Salesman
Wilfrid Lawson as Scrap Dealer
David Lodge as Sergeant
John Welsh as Chief Fire Officer
Finlay Currie as Judge
James Hayter as Pipe Smoker
Derek Nimmo as Fish Fancier
John Glyn-Jones as Fire Chief
Eynon Evans as Mayor
Diane Clare as Girl Lover
Dudley Sutton as Boy Lover
John Le Mesurier as Fisherman
John Warwick as Fireman

External links

1962 films
1962 comedy films
Films shot at Associated British Studios
Films set in London
Films set in Wales
British comedy films
British heist films
Films scored by John Addison
1960s heist films
1960s English-language films
Films directed by Michael Truman
1960s British films